Fabrizio Tosini (born November 30, 1969) is an Italian bobsledder who has competed since 1989. Competing in three Winter Olympics, he earned his best finish of 11th both in the two-man event at Salt Lake City in 2002 and in the four-man event at Turin in 2006.

Tosini also finished eighth in the two-man event at the 2004 FIBT World Championships in Königssee.

References
 
 Italian National Olympic Committee (CONI) profile 
 Fabrizio Tosini at Sports-Reference.com

1969 births
Bobsledders at the 1998 Winter Olympics
Bobsledders at the 2002 Winter Olympics
Bobsledders at the 2006 Winter Olympics
Bobsledders at the 2010 Winter Olympics
Italian male bobsledders
Living people
Olympic bobsledders of Italy